The Power To Kill is a 1934 novel by the British writer Robert Hichens.

References

Bibliography
 Vinson, James. Twentieth-Century Romance and Gothic Writers. Macmillan, 1982.

1934 British novels
Novels by Robert Hichens
Ernest Benn Limited books
Doubleday, Doran books